De Grey is an unincorporated community in Hughes County, in the U.S. state of South Dakota.

History
A post office called De Grey was established in 1886, and remained in operation until 1955. The community was named in honor of Charles DeGrey, a pioneer settler.

References

Unincorporated communities in Hughes County, South Dakota
Unincorporated communities in South Dakota